Ali Hussein Shihab (5 May 1961 – 26 October 2016) was an Iraqi football midfielder who played for Iraq in the 1986 FIFA World Cup. He also played for Al-Talaba.

Ali Hussein was an industrious player who was a regular in the midfield in the Iraqi national team during the 1980s, alongside one-time Talaba teammates Haris Mohammed, Natiq Hashim and Basil Gorgis.

Ali was part of a Talaba team that included Iraqi internationals Jamal Ali and Hussein Saeed which won three league titles during the 80s. He played in all three games in the 1986 World Cup lining up against Paraguay, Belgium and hosts Mexico. Ali was also part of the team that won the 1982 Asian Games in India, which included Raad Hammoudi, Falah Hassan and Hussein Saeed.

He died on 26 October 2016.

Career statistics

International goals
Scores and results list Iraq's goal tally first.

References

1961 births
2016 deaths
Iraqi footballers
Iraqi expatriate footballers
Iraq international footballers
Association football midfielders
Talaba SC players
Olympic footballers of Iraq
Footballers at the 1984 Summer Olympics
1986 FIFA World Cup players
Asian Games medalists in football
Footballers at the 1982 Asian Games
Asian Games gold medalists for Iraq
Medalists at the 1982 Asian Games
Iraqi expatriate sportspeople in Libya
Expatriate footballers in Libya